Lexington School District One, or Lexington One, is a school district in Lexington County, South Carolina, serving the greater areas of Lexington, Pelion, and Gilbert. Lexington One is the largest school district in Lexington County and the 6th largest school district in the state of South Carolina with an enrollment of 27,300 students.

Enrollment and geography

Lexington One serves more than 27,300 students from pre-school-kindergarten to grade 12 with more than 3,900 employees and 31 schools: 17 elementary schools; 8 middle schools; 5 high schools and 1 technology center. Lexington One is made up of 360 square miles, stretching from Lake Murray to Lexington County's southern border with Aiken County. Lexington One occupies 48% of Lexington County's 750 square miles. The 2010 Census Data shows Lexington County's population as 262,391 and the area that makes up Lexington One's population as 121,030 or 46% of the county. From 2003 to 2013 Lexington One grew by an average of 511 new students per year.

Schools

Demographics

Leadership
The Lexington County School District One Board of Trustees, who are elected to four-year terms every presidential election, meet and manage the school district's policies and finances. Dr. Gerrita Postlewait was hired in 2022 and is the current superintendent of Lexington One.

Notes

References

External links
South Carolina's Ten Largest School Districts | Alliance for Excellent Education
Lexington School District One - About Us
Lexington School District One - Board
Lexington School District One - Superintendent
Lexington School District One - Schools

Education in Lexington County, South Carolina
School districts in South Carolina